Kristoffer Egeberg (born 1974) is a Norwegian editor.

Working for the newspaper Dagbladet, he received the SKUP Award for 2014, for disclosure of sales of decommissioned naval ships of the Royal Norwegian Navy to Nigerian paramilitary groups. He also received the International Reporter’s Journalism Award for the same article series. In 2017 he became editor-in-chief of the new fact-checking website Faktisk.no.

References

Further reading 

1974 births
Living people
Norwegian journalists
Dagbladet people
Norwegian investigative journalists